Liam Walsh may refer to:

Liam Walsh (boxer) (born 1986), English boxer
 Liam Walsh (footballer) (born 1997), English footballer
 Liam Walsh (hurler) (born 1963), Irish former hurler
 Liam Walsh (rugby league) (1998–2021), rugby league player